Lauri Kalima (29 September 1916 – 24 July 2004) was a Finnish athlete. He competed in the men's high jump at the 1936 Summer Olympics.

References

1916 births
2004 deaths
Athletes (track and field) at the 1936 Summer Olympics
Finnish male high jumpers
Olympic athletes of Finland
Place of birth missing